Carex tricephala is a species in the genus Carex, family Cyperaceae. It is one of only about seven species in Carex sect. Scabrellae. Members of this section have leaf-like bracts, and small spicate inflorescences. Carex tricephala is native to Southeast Asia, reported from Cambodia, Indonesia, Laos, Myanmar, Thailand, Vietnam and the Chinese province of Yunnan.

References 

tricephala
Flora of Yunnan
Flora of Indo-China
Flora of Java
Plants described in 1875